Shreyas is an Indian male name that means "prosperity," "wellbeing," "virtuous" or "superior".

Notable people with the name include:

 Shreyas Talpade (born 1976), Indian actor
 Shreyas Gopal (born 1993), Indian cricketer
 Shreyas Iyer (born 1994), Indian cricketer
 Shreyas Ketkar (born 2003), Indian footballer
 Shreyas Movva (born 1993), Canadian cricketer

See also 
 Shreya
 Shriya

Indian masculine given names